is a public university in Nara, Nara, Japan. The predecessor of the school was founded in 1953, and it was chartered as a university in 1990.

External links
 Official website 

Educational institutions established in 1953
Public universities in Japan
Universities and colleges in Nara Prefecture
1953 establishments in Japan